The 1952 Nebraska gubernatorial election was held on November 4, 1952, and featured former Lieutenant Governor Robert B. Crosby, a Republican, defeating Democratic nominee, former state Senator Walter R. Raecke.

Democratic primary

Candidates
Nina B. Dillingham
Don Maloney
Walter R. Raecke, former Speaker of the Nebraska Legislature

Results

Republican primary

Candidates
Victor E. Anderson, Mayor of Lincoln and former member of the Nebraska Legislature
Robert B. Crosby, former Lieutenant Governor and Speaker of the Nebraska Legislature
John G. Donner
Andrew E. Swanson
Arthur B. Walker

Results

General election

Results

References

Gubernatorial
1952
Nebraska
November 1952 events in the United States